Alexander Sebastian Léonce, Baron von der Wenge, Count Lambsdorff (born 5 November 1966), commonly known as Alexander, Count Lambsdorff is a German politician of the Free Democratic Party of Germany, part of the Alliance of Liberals and Democrats for Europe. He has served as a Member of the Bundestag (MP) and Member of the European Parliament (MEP) from Germany.

A member of the noble Lambsdorff family, he holds an Imperial Russian comital title.

Early life and education
Lambsdorff grew up in Hamburg, Brussels, and Bonn, attending the Catholic Academic High School Aloisiuskolleg at Bonn-Bad Godesberg until 1985, before going up to the University of Bonn.

From 1991 until 1993 Lambsdorff studied at Georgetown University on a Fulbright Scholarship graduating as a MA in History and an MS in Foreign Service (1993).

Diplomatic career
After diplomatic training, Lambsdorff served on the German Policy Planning Staff (together with Jorgo Chatzimarkakis, his contemporary and fellow FDP MEP) before becoming director of the Bundestag office of former German Foreign Minister Klaus Kinkel, after the FDP left government in 1998.

 1994: Trainee, European Commission
 1994–95: Friedrich Naumann Foundation, Baltic States Office, Tallinn
 1997–2000: Policy Planning Staff in the German Federal Foreign Office
 2003–04: Political Department, Russia Desk in the German Federal Foreign Office
 2000–03: Press Attaché, Embassy of Germany, Washington, D.C.

Political career

Member of the European Parliament, 2004–2017
Lambsdorff was first elected to the European Parliament in 2004 and was confirmed in 2009 and 2014. Held in high regard, he was widely viewed as a possible successor to Graham Watson as leader of the Alliance of Liberals and Democrats for Europe Group in the parliament, but the post went instead to Guy Verhofstadt. From 2011, Lambsdorff chaired the 12-member German FDP delegation in the European Parliament, before subsequently being elected Leader of the European Liberals and Democrats Group in 2014.

Until 2014, Lambsdorff served as member of the European Parliament's Committee on Foreign Affairs and the EU-Delegation for relations with the People's Republic of China. He also served as a deputy on the European Parliament Committee on Culture and Education and on the Delegation to the EU-Turkey Joint Parliamentary Committee DACP as well as the ACP–EU Joint Parliamentary Assembly. During his tenure, he steered efforts to create a single EU-market for Defence and Security-related equipment as parliamentary rapporteur in 2009. In 2010, he joined the Friends of the EEAS, a unofficial and independent pressure group formed because of concerns that the High Representative of the Union for Foreign Affairs and Security Policy  Catherine Ashton was not paying sufficient attention to the Parliament and was sharing too little information on the formation of the European External Action Service.

Following the 2014 elections to the European Parliament, Lambsdorff became a member of the European Parliament Committee on International Trade. In this capacity, he has served as the parliament's rapporteur on the EU's agreement on the participation of Croatia in the European Economic Area.

Lambsdorff has led EU-Election Observer Missions on numerous occasions: as head of the EU-Election Observation Mission during the 2007–08 Kenyan crisis, he described the presidential elections as "flawed". Other elections he has overseen include the Bangladeshi general election in 2008, the first free Guinean presidential elections in 2010 and the Myanma general election in 2015.

In January 2014, at the FDP Convention in Bonn, Lambsdorff was elected as his party's lead candidate for the European Parliament elections receiving a resounding 86.2% of the vote.

From 2014, Lambsdorff served as one of the fourteen Vice Presidents of the European Parliament who sit in for the president in presiding over the plenary. In this capacity, he was also in charge of representing the parliament at multilateral bodies, including the United Nations and the World Trade Organization, as well as of the parliament’s contacts with European business associations. In addition, he was a member of the Democracy Support and Election Coordination Group (DEG), which oversees the Parliament’s election observation missions.

Member of the German Bundestag, 2017–present
Lambsdorff has been a member of the German Bundestag since the 2017 national elections. He has since been serving as one of six deputy chairpersons of the FDP parliamentary group under the leadership of its successive chairs Christian Lindner (2017-2021) and Christian Dürr (since 2021), where he oversees the group's activities on foreign policy. Since 2022, he has also been a member of the Parliamentary Oversight Panel (PKGr), which provides parliamentary oversight of Germany’s intelligence services BND, BfV and MAD.

In addition, Lambsdorff chairs the German-Israeli Parliamentary Friendship Group.

Roles within the FDP
 Founding Member of the FDP LV Net
 Member of the North Rhine-Westphalia Executive Committee
 Member of the Federal Executive Committee
 Member of the ELDR Council and Congress

Following the 2017 state elections in North Rhine-Westphalia, Lambsdorff was part of the FDP team in the negotiations with Armin Laschet’s CDU on a coalition agreement. He led his party's delegation in the working group on European affairs; his co-chair of the CDU was Matthias Kerkhoff.

In the negotiations to form a so-called traffic light coalition of the Social Democrats (SPD), the Green Party and the FDP following the 2021 federal elections, Lambsdorff led his party's delegation in the working group on foreign policy, defence, development cooperation and human rights; his co-chairs from the other parties were Heiko Maas and Omid Nouripour.

Political positions

European integration
Lambsdorff has become increasingly critical of an accession of Turkey to the European Union and publicly declared that accession talks should be suspended until the Turkish government returns to the direction of the EU. In 2011, he accused Prime Minister Recep Tayyip Erdoğan of using "gunboat rhetoric" in his statements about Israel, adding that "with a strident anti-Israel course, it isn't making any friends in Europe." On the 2014 post-election protests in Turkey, he commented: "There are more journalists in jail [in Turkey] than in China or Iran and now the Prime Minister wants to close down YouTube and Twitter because people are saying things he doesn’t like." When Erdoğan, then in his position as President of Turkey, disparaged German president Joachim Gauck as a "pastor" in 2014, Lambsdorff demanded that "the negotiations [on EU accession] should be put in a deep freeze."

Following British Prime Minister David Cameron's veto of EU-wide treaty change to tackle the European debt crisis in 2011, Lambsdorff was quoted by German weekly Der Spiegel as saying: "It was a mistake to admit the British into the European Union."

When Chancellor Angela Merkel's government opted in 2011 to abstain from United Nations Security Council Resolution 1973 authorizing military force against Libya, Lambsdorff publicly criticized his fellow FDP member and then Germany’s Foreign Minister Guido Westerwelle, arguing that "Germany's vote has weakened the EU."

Human rights
Along with his fellow parliamentarians Marietje Schaake, Ramon Tremosa and members of the Greens/EFA group, Lambsdorff nominated Leyla Yunus, imprisoned Azerbaijani human rights activist and director of the Institute of Peace and Democracy, for the 2014 Sakharov Prize.

Economic policy
As a consequence of the European debt crisis, Lambsdorff told the Financial Times Deutschland in 2012 that it might make sense to give the European Commissioner for Economic and Monetary Affairs greater influence over euro-zone countries’ budgets.
	
Following the 2014 European elections, Lambsdorff openly rejected Pierre Moscovici’s nomination as European Commissioner for Economic and Financial Affairs, Taxation and Customs, stating that Moscovici should be held accountable for France's rising deficit and worsening economic situation.

Language
In December 2014, Lambsdorff proposed that the English language should be mastered by servants of the public administration, and should later become an official language of Germany, in addition to German. According to Lambsdorff, as experienced in other countries with a good knowledge of English in public institutions, this should help to attract more skilled migrants to prevent labor shortage, to ease business for investors and to establish a more welcoming culture. As evaluated by a representative YouGov survey, 59 percent of all Germans would welcome the establishment of English as an official language in the whole European Union.

Other activities

Corporate boards
 Deutsche Gesellschaft für Internationale Zusammenarbeit (GIZ), Member of the Board of Trustees

Non-profit organizations
 Tarabya Cultural Academy, Member of the Advisory Board (since 2022)
 Haus der Geschichte, Member of the Board of Trustees (since 2022)
 Trilateral Commission, Member of the European Group (since 2021)
 German Council on Foreign Relations (DGAP), Member of the Presidium (since 2019)
 International Journalists’ Programmes (IJP), Member of the Board of Trustees
 Development and Peace Foundation (SEF), Member of the Board of Trustees (since 2019)
 German Association for Small and Medium-Sized Businesses (BVMW), Member of the Political Advisory Board (since 2018)
 Berlin office of the American Jewish Committee (AJC), Member of the Advisory Board
 Atlantik-Brücke, Member of the Board
 Atlantic Initiative, Founding Member 
 Broader European Leadership Agenda (BELA), Member of the Advisory Board
 Cercle de Lorraine, Member
 Europa-Union Deutschland, Member
 European Council on Foreign Relations (ECFR), Member
 European Security Foundation, Member of the Board of Trustees
 Friedrich Naumann Foundation, Member of the Board of Trustees
 German Institute for International and Security Affairs (SWP), Member of the Council (since 2018)
 German-Turkish Foundation, Founding Member
 , Member
 European Endowment for Democracy (EED), Member of the Board of Governors (-2017) 
 German European Security Association (GESA), Member (2006-2015)

Personal life

Count Alexander Lambsdorff is a member of the Baltic branch of the noble Lambsdorff family; his family branch emigrated from Westphalia to the Baltic region in the early 15th century and was recognised as noble in Courland in 1620. The family owned large estates in modern-day Latvia and Estonia, and family members distinguished themselves as military officers in the service of the Russian Empire. One of Alexander Lambsdorff's ancestors, Count Matthias von der Wenge Lambsdorff, was a Russian general and was conferred the hereditary comital title  in 1817 by Alexander I of Russia. In 1880 the family was authorised by royal licence to use the titles Baron of the Wenge and Count of Lambsdorff in the Kingdom of Prussia. His father, Count Hagen Lambsdorff (born 1935), was the first German Ambassador to Latvia from 1991 and later Ambassador to the Czech Republic from 1999 to 2001; his uncle, Count Otto Lambsdorff (1926–2009), was a prominent liberal politician and Federal Minister for Economic Affairs from 1977 to 1982.

In 1994, Lambsdorff married Franziska, daughter of Werner von Klitzing and Princess Osterlind of Wied, by whom he has two children.

Notes

It is equivalent to the noble rank of earl (female form: countess).

References

External links
 
 
 

1966 births
Counts of Germany
Free Democratic Party (Germany) MEPs
Georgetown University alumni
Living people
MEPs for Germany 2004–2009
MEPs for Germany 2009–2014
MEPs for Germany 2014–2019
Politicians from Cologne
Russian nobility
University of Bonn alumni
Members of the Bundestag 2017–2021
Members of the Bundestag 2021–2025
Members of the Bundestag for the Free Democratic Party (Germany)
Fulbright alumni